Abdul Rahman bin Bakar is a Malaysian politician, a former Member of Parliament (House of Representative and House of Senate) and a former Deputy Minister of Human Resources. He is famously known as the 'giant-killer' in Malaysian politics, due to his record of defeating top prominent politician of PAS, Abdul Hadi Awang, twice during the general elections.

Election results

Honours
  :
  Companion Class I of the Exalted Order of Malacca (DMSM) – Datuk (2004)
  :
  Knight Commander of the Order of the Crown of Terengganu (DPMT) - Dato' (2006)
  :
  Grand Knight of the Order of Sultan Ahmad Shah of Pahang (SSAP) – Dato' Sri (2014)

References

Living people
1952 births
People from Terengganu
Malaysian people of Malay descent
Malaysian Muslims
United Malays National Organisation politicians
Members of the Dewan Rakyat
Members of the Dewan Negara
Knights Commander of the Order of the Crown of Terengganu